Kalinka is the name of several rural localities in Russia:
Kalinka, Khabarovsk Krai, a selo in Khabarovsky District of Khabarovsk Krai; 
Kalinka, Samara Oblast, a settlement in Volzhsky District of Samara Oblast;